Venus Williams won in the final 6–2, 3–6, 6–2 against Patty Schnyder.

Seeds
Champion seeds are indicated in bold text while text in italics indicates the round in which those seeds were eliminated.

 Martina Hingis (semifinals)
 Lindsay Davenport (first round)
 Arantxa Sánchez-Vicario (first round)
 Jana Novotná (first round)

Draw

Finals

External links
 Official Results Archive (ITF)
 Official Results Archive (WTA)

Women's Singles
Singles